Stephen Charles Booth (born 30 October 1963 in Leeds, England) was a first-class cricketer who played for Somerset County Cricket Club from 1983 to 1985.

Born at Cross Gates in Leeds, Booth attended Boston Spa Comprehensive School and made his debut as a right-handed batsman and slow left-arm orthodox bowler in a Somerset side boasting such talents as Joel Garner and Viv Richards.

In 33 first-class matches he took 87 wickets, with a best of 4/26, at an average of 36.31.  He scored 202 runs, with a highest score of 42, at 10.63.

Peter Roebuck nicknamed him 'Heathcliff' in his published diary of a county season.

References 
 

1963 births
English cricketers
Cricketers from Leeds
Somerset cricketers
Living people
People educated at Boston Spa Academy